Matt Bradley (May 20, 1960 – 2002) was an American football linebacker who played one season in the United States Football League (USFL) with the Philadelphia Stars and Boston Breakers. He was drafted by the Houston Oilers in the ninth round of the 1982 NFL Draft. He played college football at Penn State University.

Early years
Bradley played high school football at Bishop McCort High School in Johnstown, Pennsylvania. He was a 1st Team Associated Press All-State selection his senior year in 1977.

College career
Bradley played for the Penn State Nittany Lions from 1978 to 1981.

Professional career
Bradley was selected by the Houston Oilers with the 234th pick in the 1982 NFL Draft. He for the Philadelphia Stars of the United States Football League in 1983. He played for the Boston Breakers of the USFL in 1983.

Personal life
Bradley's father, Sam, played basketball at the University of Pittsburgh. His older brother Jim was a captain and linebacker at Penn State from 1973 to 1974, was a member of the Cincinnati Bengals, and is the long-time team surgeon for the Pittsburgh Steelers. His older brother Tom played for the Nittany Lions from 1975 to 1978. His two sisters Patty and Cassy were All-American track athletes at Villanova University.

Death
Bradley died of an esophageal ailment in 2002.

References

External links
Just Sports Stats

1960 births
2002 deaths
Players of American football from Pennsylvania
American football linebackers
Penn State Nittany Lions football players
Philadelphia/Baltimore Stars players
Boston/New Orleans/Portland Breakers players
Sportspeople from Johnstown, Pennsylvania